Sir Ronald William Mack (20 May 1904 – 12 February 1968) was an Australian politician.

He was born at Warrnambool to wool buyer Frederick David Mack and Elizabeth Edith Hatton. He attended Warrnambool High School and qualified as an accountant in 1927. From 1930 he ran his own accountancy firm. On 20 February 1935, he married Helen Isobel Janet Lindsay; they had one son. He later remarried fellow accountant Winifred Helen Crutchfield on 20 September 1958. From 1939 to 1940 he was a member of Warrnambool City Council. He served in World War II and was twice mentioned in dispatches; he lost his right eye at El Alamein. From 1944 he was again an accountant, and he became involved in the Liberal and Country Party. He served one term in the Victorian Legislative Assembly as the member for Warrnambool. In 1955 he was elected to the Victorian Legislative Council as a member for Western Province. He served as Minister of Health from 1961 to 1965, when he was elected President of the Legislative Council. He was knighted in 1967, but died the following year at Hawthorn.

References

1904 births
1968 deaths
Liberal Party of Australia members of the Parliament of Victoria
Members of the Victorian Legislative Assembly
Members of the Victorian Legislative Council
Presidents of the Victorian Legislative Council
Australian Knights Bachelor
20th-century Australian politicians
People from Warrnambool
Australian military personnel of World War II
Military personnel from Victoria (Australia)